Al-ʿAbbās ibn Saʿid al-Jawharī, known as Al-Jawhari, was a geometer who worked at the House of Wisdom in Baghdad and for in a short time in Damascus, where he made astronomical observations. Born (and probably dying) in Baghdad, he was probably of Iranian origin. His most important work was his commentary on Euclid's Elements, which contained nearly 50 additional propositions and an attempted mathematical proof of the parallel postulate.

Described as having superb knowledge of Greek, which was unusual for a Muslim scholar), Al-Jawhari is credited with a translation into Arabic of the Indian polymath Shanaq al-Hindi's Book of Poisons.

References

Sources

Further reading
 
  (PDF version)

 

800s births
860 deaths
People from Baghdad
9th-century Iranian mathematicians
9th-century mathematicians
9th-century people from the Abbasid Caliphate
Mathematicians from the Abbasid Caliphate
Astronomers from the Abbasid Caliphate
Astronomers of the medieval Islamic world
Middle Persian–Arabic translators
9th-century Arabic writers